Sarda is a genus of medium-sized, predatory ray-finned bony fish in the family Scombridae, and belonging to the tribe Sardini, more commonly called the bonito tribe.  There are four species which comprise the genus Sarda.  One of those species, the Pacific bonito, is further divided into two subspecies.

Species 
The following species are included in the genus Sarda:

 Sarda australis Macleay, 1881 (Australian bonito)
 Sarda chiliensis (Cuvier, 1832) (Eastern Pacific bonito)
 Sarda lineolata (Girard, 1858) (Pacific bonito)
 Sarda orientalis (Temminck & Schlegel, 1844) (Striped bonito)
 Sarda sarda (Bloch, 1793) (Atlantic bonito)

References 

 

Scombridae
Marine fish genera
Taxa named by Georges Cuvier